Deh Shad may refer to:
 Deh Shad-e Bala
 Deh Shad-e Pain